Khanfar may refer to:

 Khanfar, Abyan, Yemen
 Khanfar, Hadhramaut, Yemen
 Wadah Khanfar, director of Al Jazeera